Brian Arthur Savage (born February 24, 1971) is a Canadian former professional ice hockey left winger who played twelve seasons in the National Hockey League (NHL) for the Montreal Canadiens, Phoenix Coyotes, St. Louis Blues and Philadelphia Flyers.

Playing career
Savage attended Lo-Ellen Park Secondary School in Sudbury as a teenager.  He was a proficient golfer and track athlete.  He played one season with the Sudbury Cubs of the Northern Ontario Junior Hockey League before jumping to college.

The nephew of former NHL players Larry, Wayne and Floyd Hillman. Savage was originally drafted in 1991 in the 8th round, 171st overall by the Montreal Canadiens. After completing his college hockey career at Miami University, he began his professional career with the Fredericton Canadiens of the AHL in 1993. His first taste of the National Hockey League came at the tail end of the 1993–94 season, playing in 3 regular season and 3 playoff games.

Savage was the first Montreal Canadien since Joe Malone in 1917 to record six points in a road game when he had four goals and two assists against the Islanders on April 8, 1999. He also recorded the Canadiens' first hat trick in Bell Centre history on October 7, 1996. After several fast starts in the month of October and subsequently fading the rest of those seasons, Savage became known as hockey's "Mr. October".

After parts of eight seasons with the Canadiens, Savage was traded to the Phoenix Coyotes on January 25, 2002, along with a 2002 3rd-round pick for Sergei Berezin. On December 27, 2003, he scored the first Coyote goal in Jobing.com Arena. He was soon after traded to the St. Louis Blues for their playoff run. Due to the parameters of the trade, he was claimed off waivers by Phoenix in the off-season.

Following the 2004–05 NHL lockout, Phoenix bought out his contract for $1.9 million. Savage signed a one-year deal with the Philadelphia Flyers prior to the 2005–06 NHL season. After one season in Philadelphia, Savage announced his retirement on September 21, 2006.

Savage was the co-owner of the now defunct New Mexico Scorpions of the Central Hockey League while he was playing for the Flyers.

Personal life
Savage's son, Redmond, was drafted in the fourth round, 114th overall, by the Detroit Red Wings in the 2021 NHL Entry Draft.

Awards and honours

Career statistics

Regular season and playoffs

International

References

External links
 
 Brian Savage at Sports Reference
 https://web.archive.org/web/20130119174827/http://databaseolympics.com/players/playerpage.htm?ilkid=SAVAGBRI01

1971 births
Living people
Battle of the Blades participants
Canadian ice hockey left wingers
Fredericton Canadiens players
Ice hockey people from Ontario
Sportspeople from Greater Sudbury
Ice hockey players at the 1994 Winter Olympics
Medalists at the 1994 Winter Olympics
Miami RedHawks men's ice hockey players
Montreal Canadiens draft picks
Montreal Canadiens players
Olympic ice hockey players of Canada
Olympic medalists in ice hockey
Olympic silver medalists for Canada
Philadelphia Flyers players
Phoenix Coyotes players
St. Louis Blues players
AHCA Division I men's ice hockey All-Americans